Groupe de Développement Sportif (GDS; "Sports Development Group") is Canada's national motorsport authority, as delegated by the FIA.

In April 2020, the FIA (Fédération Internationale de l’Automobile) announced the appointment of GDS (Groupe de Développement Sportif) as the new National Sporting Authority in Canada. The organization took over from ASN Canada FIA, which resigned in December 2019.

Regional Territories
There are five territories and one national rally group to administer amateur motor sport in Canada:

 Canadian Association of Car Clubs (CACC) – British Columbia
 Western Canada Motorsport Association (WCMA) – Western Canada
 Canadian Automobile Sport Clubs Ontario Region (CASC-OR) – Ontario
 Auto Sport Québec (ASQ) – Québec
 Atlantic Region Motor Sports Inc. (ARMS) – Atlantic Canada
 Canadian Association of Rally Sport (CARS) – National Rally organization

References

External links 
 Groupe de développement sportif

National sporting authorities of the FIA
Sports governing bodies in Canada
Motorsport in Canada
2020 establishments in Canada